Low Hang Yee (Chinese: 刘航益; born 22 February 1997) is a Malaysian badminton player. He won his first international title at the 2022 Ukraine Open partnered with Chia Wei Jie.

Career 
Partnered with Ng Eng Cheong, they were runners-up at the Lao International and the Malaysia International. They were also part of the Malaysian squad that participated in the 2019 Badminton Asia Mixed Team Championships. Their best result together was getting into the quarterfinals of the 2021 Swiss Open where they won against 4th seeds Marcus Ellis and Chris Langridge but lost to Kim Astrup and Anders Skaarup Rasmussen in three games.

Prior to his partnership with Ng, he played mixed doubles with Cheah Yee See and were runners-up at the 2016 India International.

In 2021, he was selected as a backup player for the 2020 Thomas Cup. Later that same year, he partnered with Chia Wei Jie and were semifinalists at the Czech Open. In 2022, they were runners-up at the Swedish Open and won the Ukraine Open.

Achievements

BWF International Challenge/Series (1 title, 4 runners-up) 
Men's doubles

Mixed doubles

  BWF International Challenge tournament
  BWF International Series tournament
  BWF Future Series tournament

References

External links 
 

Living people
1997 births
People from Selangor
Malaysian sportspeople of Chinese descent
Malaysian male badminton players